Stockton A. "Sox" Raymond (June 19, 1882 - April 22, 1973) was the last basketball head coach at Ohio State University before the school began to give full-year salaries and faculty status to their athletic coaches.  He was succeeded by Lynn St. John, who was also the Ohio State athletic director.  Raymond had been a 1905 graduate of Ohio State, and a member of the baseball and basketball teams.  He remained the Ohio State coach for one year, finishing with a record of 7-2.  His coaching staff included one assistant, H. J. Hegelheimer, a 1907 graduate of the university.

1882 births
Year of death missing
Ohio State Buckeyes baseball players
Ohio State Buckeyes men's basketball coaches
Ohio State Buckeyes men's basketball players